John Percy Camm (1873-1943) was an Australian geographer who served as the Surveyor General of Western Australia from 1923 to 1938.

Biography 

He was born in Yeo, Victoria on 02 November 1873. His parents were John Samuel Camm and Hannah Jane Camm.

He was married to Sarah May Camm and had four children.

He died on 18 April 1943. He is survived by two sons and two daughters.

Education 

He completed his schooling at the Creswick Grammar School.

He graduated from the Ballarat School of Mines and from Melbourne University.

Career  

He joined the Survey Department in 1895.

In 1923, he was appointed as the Surveyor General of Western Australia by the department of land administration.

He retired in 1938 and he was succeeded by Wallace Vernon Fyfe as Surveyor General of Western Australia.

See also 

 List of pastoral leases in Western Australia
 Surveyor General of Western Australia

References

External links 
 Biography

1873 births
1943 deaths
Australian geographers
Australian surveyors
Surveyors General of Western Australia